Lyle Brent Foster (born 3 September 2000) is a South African professional football player who plays as a forward for EFL Championship  club Burnley and the South Africa national team.

Club career
Having been promoted to the Orlando Pirates' first team for the 2017–18 season, Foster was named among English newspaper The Guardian's top 60 most promising young players in the world. He signed for Monaco in January 2019 on a deal until June 2023, where he would begin on the reserve team.

On 30 August 2019, Foster joined Monaco's farm-club Cercle Brugge in Belgium on a season-long loan.

On 13 August 2020, Foster became a new player of Vitória de Guimarães. In 2021, he joined Westerlo on a season long loan until 30 June 2022.

In the summer of 2022, Foster moved to Westerlo on a permanent basis and signed a four-year contract with the club.

In January 2023, Foster signed for EFL Championship club Burnley on a four-and-a-half year contract.

Career statistics

Club

International

International goals

Honors
Westerlo

 Belgian First Division B: 2021–22

South Africa U20

COSAFA U-20 Cup:2017

References

2000 births
Living people
South African soccer players
Sportspeople from Soweto
Association football forwards
Orlando Pirates F.C. players
AS Monaco FC players
Cercle Brugge K.S.V. players
Vitória S.C. players
Vitória S.C. B players
K.V.C. Westerlo players
Burnley F.C. players
South African Premier Division players
Championnat National 2 players
Ligue 1 players
Belgian Pro League players
Primeira Liga players
Campeonato de Portugal (league) players
Challenger Pro League players
South Africa international soccer players
South African expatriate soccer players
Expatriate footballers in Monaco
Expatriate footballers in Belgium
Expatriate footballers in Portugal
South African expatriate sportspeople in Monaco
South African expatriate sportspeople in Belgium
South African expatriate sportspeople in Portugal
2019 Africa U-23 Cup of Nations players
South Africa youth international soccer players
South Africa under-20 international soccer players